Delival da Fonseca Nobre (born 27 September 1948) is a Brazilian sports shooter. He competed at the 1976 Summer Olympics, the 1984 Summer Olympics and the 1988 Summer Olympics.

References

1948 births
Living people
Brazilian male sport shooters
Olympic shooters of Brazil
Shooters at the 1976 Summer Olympics
Shooters at the 1984 Summer Olympics
Shooters at the 1988 Summer Olympics
Sportspeople from Pará
Pan American Games medalists in shooting
Pan American Games bronze medalists for Brazil
Shooters at the 1983 Pan American Games
21st-century Brazilian people
20th-century Brazilian people